Vexillum baccheti is a species of sea snail, a marine gastropod mollusk, in the family Costellariidae, the ribbed miters.

Description
The length of the shell attains 13.1 mm.

Distribution
This marine species occurs off Tahiti.

References

 Salisbury, R. A.; Herrmann, M. (2012). Three new Costellariidae species (Gastropoda) described from French Polynesia. Novapex. 13(3-4): 107-111

baccheti
Gastropods described in 2012